Contemporary art is the art of today, produced in the second half of the 20th century or in the 21st century. Contemporary artists work in a globally influenced, culturally diverse, and technologically advancing world. Their art is a dynamic combination of materials, methods, concepts, and subjects that continue the challenging of boundaries that was already well underway in the 20th century. Diverse and eclectic, contemporary art as a whole is distinguished by the very lack of a uniform, organising principle, ideology, or "-ism". Contemporary art is part of a cultural dialogue that concerns larger contextual frameworks such as personal and cultural identity, family, community, and nationality.

In vernacular English, modern and contemporary are synonyms, resulting in some conflation and confusion of the terms modern art and contemporary art by non-specialists.

Scope
Some define contemporary art as art produced within "our lifetime," recognising that lifetimes and life spans vary. However, there is a recognition that this generic definition is subject to specialized limitations.

The classification of "contemporary art" as a special type of art, rather than a general adjectival phrase, goes back to the beginnings of Modernism in the English-speaking world. In London, the Contemporary Art Society was founded in 1910 by the critic Roger Fry and others, as a private society for buying works of art to place in public museums. A number of other institutions using the term were founded in the 1930s, such as in 1938 the Contemporary Art Society of Adelaide, Australia, and an increasing number after 1945. Many, like the Institute of Contemporary Art, Boston changed their names from ones using "Modern art" in this period, as Modernism became defined as a historical art movement, and much "modern" art ceased to be "contemporary". The definition of what is contemporary is naturally always on the move, anchored in the present with a start date that moves forward, and the works the Contemporary Art Society bought in 1910 could no longer be described as contemporary.

Particular points that have been seen as marking a change in art styles include the end of World War II and the 1960s. There has perhaps been a lack of natural break points since the 1960s, and definitions of what constitutes "contemporary art" in the 2010s vary, and are mostly imprecise. Art from the past 20 years is very likely to be included, and definitions often include art going back to about 1970; "the art of the late 20th and early 21st century"; "both an outgrowth and a rejection of modern art"; "Strictly speaking, the term "contemporary art" refers to art made and produced by artists living today"; "Art from the 1960s or [19]70s up until this very minute"; and sometimes further, especially in museum contexts, as museums which form a permanent collection of contemporary art inevitably find this aging. Many use the formulation "Modern and Contemporary Art", which avoids this problem. Smaller commercial galleries, magazines and other sources may use stricter definitions, perhaps restricting the "contemporary" to work from 2000 onwards. Artists who are still productive after a long career, and ongoing art movements, may present a particular issue; galleries and critics are often reluctant to divide their work between the contemporary and non-contemporary.

Sociologist Nathalie Heinich draws a distinction between modern and contemporary art, describing them as two different paradigms which partially overlap historically. She found that while "modern art" challenges the conventions of representation, "contemporary art" challenges the very notion of an artwork. She regards Duchamp's Fountain (which was made in the 1910s in the midst of the triumph of modern art) as the starting point of contemporary art, which gained momentum after World War II with Gutai's performances, Yves Klein's monochromes and Rauschenberg's Erased de Kooning Drawing.

Themes

Contemporary artwork is characterised by diversity: diversity of material, of form, of subject matter, and even time periods. It is "distinguished by the very lack of a uniform organizing principle, ideology, or - ism" that is seen in many other art periods and movements. The focus of Modernism is self-referential. Impressionism looks at our perception of a moment through light and color, as opposed to the attempt to reflect stark reality in Realism. Contemporary art, on the other hand, does not have one, single objective or point of view, so it can be contradictory and open-ended. There are nonetheless several common themes that have appeared in contemporary works, such as identity politics, the body, globalization and migration, technology, contemporary society and culture, time and memory, and institutional and political critique.

Institutions

The functioning of the art world is dependent on art institutions, ranging from major museums to private galleries, non-profit spaces, art schools and publishers, and the practices of individual artists, curators, writers, collectors, and philanthropists. A major division in the art world is between the for-profit and non-profit sectors, although in recent years the boundaries between for-profit private and non-profit public institutions have become increasingly blurred. Most well-known contemporary art is exhibited by professional artists at commercial contemporary art galleries, by private collectors, art auctions, corporations, publicly funded arts organizations, contemporary art museums or by artists themselves in artist-run spaces. Contemporary artists are supported by grants, awards, and prizes as well as by direct sales of their work. Career artists train at art school or emerge from other fields.

There are close relationships between publicly funded contemporary art organizations and the commercial sector. For instance, in 2005 the book Understanding International Art Markets and Management reported that in Britain a handful of dealers represented the artists featured in leading publicly funded contemporary art museums. Commercial organizations include galleries and art fairs.

Corporations have also integrated themselves into the contemporary art world, exhibiting contemporary art within their premises, organizing and sponsoring contemporary art awards, and building up extensive corporate collections. Corporate advertisers frequently use the prestige associated with contemporary art and coolhunting to draw the attention of consumers to luxury goods.

The institutions of art have been criticized for regulating what is designated as contemporary art. Outsider art, for instance, is literally contemporary art, in that it is produced in the present day. However, one critic has argued it is not considered so because the artists are self-taught and are thus assumed to be working outside of an art historical context. Craft activities, such as textile design, are also excluded from the realm of contemporary art, despite large audiences for exhibitions. Art critic Peter Timms has said that attention is drawn to the way that craft objects must subscribe to particular values in order to be admitted to the realm of contemporary art. "A ceramic object that is intended as a subversive comment on the nature of beauty is more likely to fit the definition of contemporary art than one that is simply beautiful."

At any one time a particular place or group of artists can have a strong influence on subsequent contemporary art. For instance, The Ferus Gallery was a commercial gallery in Los Angeles and re-invigorated the Californian contemporary art scene in the late fifties and the sixties.

Public attitudes
Contemporary art can sometimes seem at odds with a public that does not feel that art and its institutions share its values. In Britain, in the 1990s, contemporary art became a part of popular culture, with artists becoming stars, but this did not lead to a hoped-for "cultural utopia". Some critics like Julian Spalding and Donald Kuspit have suggested that skepticism, even rejection, is a legitimate and reasonable response to much contemporary art. Brian Ashbee in an essay called "Art Bollocks" criticizes "much installation art, photography, conceptual art, video and other practices generally called post-modern" as being too dependent on verbal explanations in the form of theoretical discourse. However, the acceptance of non traditional art in museums has increased due to changing perspectives on what constitutes an art piece.

Concerns

A common concern since the early part of the 20th century has been the question of what constitutes art. In the contemporary period (1950 to now), the concept of avant-garde may come into play in determining what art is noticed by galleries, museums, and collectors.

The concerns of contemporary art come in for criticism too. Andrea Rosen has said that some contemporary painters "have absolutely no idea of what it means to be a contemporary artist" and that they "are in it for all the wrong reasons."

Prizes
Some competitions, awards, and prizes in contemporary art are:

 Emerging Artist Award awarded by The Aldrich Contemporary Art Museum
 Factor Prize in Southern Art
 Hugo Boss Prize awarded by the Solomon R. Guggenheim Museum
 John Moore's Painting Prize
 Kandinsky Prize for Russian artists under 30
 Marcel Duchamp Prize awarded by ADIAF and Centre Pompidou
 Ricard Prize for a French artist under 40
 Turner Prize for British artists
 Participation in the Whitney Biennial
 Vincent Award, The Vincent van Gogh Biennial Award for Contemporary Art in Europe
 The Winifred Shantz Award for Ceramists, awarded by the Canadian Clay and Glass Gallery
 Asia Pacific Breweries Foundation Signature Art Prize
 Jindřich Chalupecký Award for Czech artists under 35

History
This table lists art movements and styles by decade. It should not be assumed to be conclusive.

See also

 Acculturation
 Anti-art and Anti-anti-art
 Art:21 - Art in the 21st Century (2001-2016), a PBS series
 Criticism of postmodernism
 Classificatory disputes about art
 List of contemporary art museums
 List of contemporary artists
 Medium specificity
 Reductive art
 Value theory
 Visual arts
 Word art
 New media art

Notes

References

Further reading
 Altshuler, B. (2013). Biennials and Beyond: Exhibitions that Made Art History: 1962-2002. New York, N.Y.: Phaidon Press, 
 
 Danto, A. C. (2013). What is art. New Haven: Yale University Press, 
 Desai, V. N. (Ed.). (2007). Asian art history in the twenty-first century. Williamstown, Mass.: Sterling and Francine Clark Art Institute, 
 Fullerton, E. (2016). Artrage! : the story of the BritArt revolution. London: Thames & Hudson Ltd, 
 Gielen, Pascal (2009). The Murmuring of the Artistic Multitude: Global Art, Memory and Post-Fordism. Amsterdam: Valiz, 
 Gompertz, W. (2013). What Are You Looking At?: The Surprising, Shocking, and Sometimes Strange Story of 150 Years of Modern Art (2nd ed.). New York, N.Y.: Plume, 
 Harris, J. (2011). Globalization and Contemporary Art. Hoboken, N.J.: Wiley-Blackwell, 
 Lailach, M. (2007). Land Art. London: Taschen, 
 Martin, S. (2006). Video Art. (U. Grosenick, Ed.). Los Angeles: Taschen, 
 Mercer, K. (2008). Exiles, diasporas & strangers. Cambridge, Massachusetts: MIT Press, 
 Robertson, J., & McDaniel, C. (2012). Themes of Contemporary Art: Visual Art after 1980 (3rd ed.). Oxford: Oxford University Press, 
 Robinson, H. (Ed.). (2015). Feminism-art-theory : an anthology 1968-2014 (2nd ed.). Chichester, West Sussex: Wiley-Blackwell, 
 Stiles, Kristine and Peter Howard Selz, Theories and Documents of Contemporary Art, A Sourcebook of Artists's Writings (1996), 
 Strehovec, J. (2020).Contemporary Art Impacts on Scientific, Social, and Cultural Paradigms: Emerging Research and Opportunities. Hershey, PA: IGIGlobal.
 Thompson, D. (2010). The $12 Million Stuffed Shark: The Curious Economics of Contemporary Art. New York, N.Y.: St. Martin's Griffin, 
 Thorton, S. (2009). Seven Days in the Art World. New York, N.Y.: W.W. Norton & Company, 
 Wallace, Isabelle Loring and Jennie Hirsh, Contemporary Art and Classical Myth. Farnham: Ashgate (2011), 
 Warr, T. (Ed.). (2012). The Artist’s Body (Revised). New York, N.Y.: Phaidon Press, 
 Wilson, M. (2013). How to read contemporary art : experiencing the art of the 21st century. New York, N.Y.: Abrams,

External links
 

 
Postmodern art
Postmodernism
Art by period of creation